Butyrylcholine is a choline-based ester that can function as a neurotransmitter. It is similar to acetylcholine, with activation of some of the same receptors as acetylcholine. Butyrylcholine is a synthetic compound and does not occur in the body naturally. It is used as a clinical laboratory tool to distinguish between the cholinesterases; acetylcholinesterase and butyrylcholinesterase preferentially lyse acetylcholine and butyrylcholine, respectively. It is also known as pseudocholinesterase.

References 

Quaternary ammonium compounds
Butyrate esters